Tales from Pleasure Beach is a British television drama series first broadcast on BBC Two between 2 and 16 August 2001. Written by Welsh playwright Roger Williams, the three episodes each feature a self-contained story against the backdrop of a seaside amusement park.

The series received a BAFTA Awards nomination for Best Drama Series, but was beaten to the award by Cold Feet.

Filmed at Coney Beach Amusement Park in Porthcawl, South Wales, and Aberavon, Port Talbot, the series included performances from Ruth Jones, Rachel Isaac, Eve Myles and Siwan Morris.

Episodes

Reception
Esther Addley, reviewing the second episode for The Guardian, said Tales from Pleasure Beach was "nicely shot, well acted and refreshingly frank in its portrayal of alcopop-swilling sexual manners", however she found it "rattling through a series of stock tableaux that juddered perceptively under the weight of their agony aunt morality".

References

External links
 
 

BBC television dramas
2000s British anthology television series
2000s British drama television series
2001 British television series debuts
2001 British television series endings
2000s British television miniseries
Television shows set in Wales
English-language television shows
Films directed by Edmund Coulthard